The Meghalayan age is the name given in 2018, by the International Commission on Stratigraphy, to the current age or latest geologic age – or uppermost stage of the Quaternary. It is also the upper, or latest, of three subdivisions of the Holocene epoch or series. This way of breaking down time is based only on geology; for example it's unrelated to the three age system of historical periods into which human development is sometimes divided.

The Meghalayan begins 4,200 years BP ( 2251 BCE or 7750 HE), leaving room for the possible introduction of the Anthropocene. Helama & Oinonen (2019) dated the start of the Meghalayan to 2190-1990 BCE. The age began with a 200-year drought that impacted human civilizations in the Eastern Mediterranean, Mesopotamia, the Indus Valley and the Yangtze River Valley. "The fact that the beginning of this age coincides with a cultural shift caused by a global climate event makes it unique," according to Stanley Finney, Secretary General of the International Union of Geological Sciences.

Origins

This age is named after the Northeast Indian state of Meghalaya, where the stalagmite was found that is used to mark out its years. 

The International Commission on Stratigraphy officially ratified this age in June 2018, along with the earlier Greenlandian and Northgrippian ages/stages. Its Global Boundary Stratotype Section and Point (GSSP) is a Krem Mawmluh Cave formation in Meghalaya. Mawmluh cave is one of the longest and deepest caves in India, and conditions there were suitable for preserving chemical signs of the transition in ages. The global auxiliary stratotype is an ice core from Mount Logan in Canada.

IUGS geological heritage site
In respect of the Mawmluh Cave site being the "GSSP of the youngest unit of the geologic time scale associated with dramatic climate changes with implications on human civilisation" the International Union of Geological Sciences (IUGS) included the GSSP of the Meghalayan Stage in the Mawmluh Cave in its assemblage of 100 "geological heritage sites" around the world in a listing published in October 2022. The organisation defines an IUGS Geological Heritage Site as "a key place with geological elements and/or processes of international scientific relevance, used as a reference, and/or with a substantial contribution to the development of geological sciences through history."

See also 
 Geologic time scale
 4.2-kiloyear event

References

External links
 Chronostratigraphy benchmarks
Meghalayan Age in details

3rd millennium BC
01
First 100 IUGS Geological Heritage Sites
Geological epochs

03